Navbahor (formerly: Avzikent) is a village and jamoat in north-western Tajikistan. It is located in Mastchoh District in Sughd Region. The jamoat has a total population of 13,388 (2015).

References

Populated places in Sughd Region
Jamoats of Tajikistan